Girdhar or Giradhara (1787–1852) was an ancient Gujarati poet.

Works
Girdhar is known for his poetic epic Ramayana (1837) which is popular in Gujarat. He derived the story from Ramayana of Tulsidas and several other Puranic texts. His version is lucid and musical as it is in simple language and uses traditional metres and melodies. His poetry Radha Virahna Barmas is influenced by the poetry of Vaishnavism. His Tulsi Vivah narrates the wedding of Krishna and Tulsi in 26 lyrics. It resemble the Kadva (cantos) style of medieval Gujarati poetry. He also wrote lyrics on Gopi and Krishna relations and wrote Ashwamedha and Rajsuyayajna. He based a large number of his poems on Dasamskandha of Bhagavata.

See also
 List of Gujarati-language writers

References

19th-century Indian poets
1787 births
1852 deaths
Gujarati-language poets